Prebediolone acetate (brand names Acetoxanon, Acetoxanone, Acetoxy-Prenolon, Artisone, Artivis, Pregnartrone, Sterosone), also known as 21-hydroxypregnenolone 21-acetate or 21-acetoxypregnenolone (A.O.P.), as well as 3β,21-dihydroxypregn-5-en-20-one 21-acetate, is a synthetic pregnane steroid which is described as a glucocorticoid and has been used in the treatment of rheumatoid arthritis. It is the C21 acetate ester of prebediolone (21-hydroxypregnenolone), the C21 hydroxylated derivative of pregnenolone. Prebediolone acetate has been known since at least 1950. The compound is also an intermediate in a synthesis of deoxycorticosterone acetate (21-acetoxyprogesterone).

See also
 Pregnenolone acetate
 Pregnenolone succinate

References

Abandoned drugs
Acetate esters
Steroid esters
Ketones
Glucocorticoids
Pregnanes
Prodrugs